The 1969 Iowa State Cyclones football team represented Iowa State University in the Big Eight Conference during the 1969 NCAA University Division football season. In their second year under head coach Johnny Majors, the Cyclones compiled a 3–7 record (1–6 against conference opponents), finished in seventh place in the conference, and were outscored by opponents by a combined total of 231 to 152. They played their home games at Clyde Williams Field in Ames, Iowa.

Jerry Fiat and Fred Jones were the team captains. Joe Avezzano coached the freshman team.

Schedule

Roster

References

Iowa State
Iowa State Cyclones football seasons
Iowa State Cyclones football